The  Beardsley meteorite is a meteorite that fell in Beardsley, Kansas, on October 15, 1929. It is a chondritic type

See also
 Glossary of meteoritics
 Meteorite falls

References

1929 in the United States
Geology of Kansas
Meteorites found in the United States
1929 in Kansas